Laura Marie Greenwood (1897–1951) was an American painter of portraits and still lifes. She worked with oils, watercolors and pastels. Greenwood also lectured on art history and taught fine art.

Biography
Greenwood was born in 1897 in Philadelphia, Pennsylvania. She studied at Temple University, La France Art Institute, and Moore College of Art and Design where she graduated in 1933. Her studies continued at the Barnes Foundation and with Earle Horter.

She was active in Philadelphia and exhibited her work in the city at the Pennsylvania Academy of the Fine Arts and in New York and Washington, D.C. Greenwood painted portraits, especially of young women, floral still lifes, and landscapes. She painted with oils on canvas and over her career her brush strokes became more free and expressive. She also worked in watercolor, and was elected a member of the Philadelphia Watercolour Club and was also a member of The Plastic Club. Greenwood was proficient in pastels. She made Impressionist and Regionalist works, but was a particularly adventurous Modernist.

Greenwood taught fine art and was a lecturer on American art history.

Greenwood died in Philadelphia on July 25, 1951, at the age of 54. She was buried in the Cedar Hill Cemetery on July 30. There was an exhibition of her work held in 1987 at the Lagakos-Turak Gallery entitled "Laura M. Greenwood: American Paintings of the 1930s and 40s."

References

Further reading 
 Davenport, Ray. Davenport's Art Reference, 2005.
 Falk, Peter Hastings. Annual Exhibition Record, National Academy of Design, 1990.
 Falk, Peter Hastings. Who Was Who in American Art, 1564-1975, 1999.
 Petteys, Chris. Dictionary of Women Artists: An International Dictionary of Women Artists Born Before 1900, 1985
 Preato, Robert and Sandra Langer, Impressionism & Post-Impressionism, 1988.

1897 births
1951 deaths
Moore College of Art and Design alumni
Painters from Pennsylvania
20th-century American painters
20th-century American women artists
American women painters